Toni Ritter (born February 6, 1990) is a German professional ice hockey player who is currently playing for the Dresdner Eislöwen in the DEL2.

He previously played in the Deutsche Eishockey Liga with the Adler Mannheim, Krefeld Pinguine, Iserlohn Roosters and EHC Red Bull München before signing a one-year contract with Schwenninger Wild Wings on April 18, 2015.

References

External links

1990 births
Living people
People from Bad Muskau
German ice hockey forwards
Adler Mannheim players
Drummondville Voltigeurs players
Heilbronner Falken players
Iserlohn Roosters players
Kassel Huskies players
Krefeld Pinguine players
Montreal Junior Hockey Club players
EHC München players
Schwenninger Wild Wings players
Shawinigan Cataractes players
Sportspeople from Saxony